M. Taher Saif  is a Bangladeshi American mechanical engineer, currently the Edward William and Jane Marr Gutgsell Professor at the University of Illinois. He is known for his work in the pursuit of a cure to cancer.

Taher Saif studied civil engineering at the Bangladesh University of Engineering and Technology (BUET). He has a master's degree in civil engineering, a doctorate in electrical engineering, and a post-doctoral degree in mechanical engineering.

Personal life
Taher Saif lives in Champaign, Illinois with his wife and children.

References 

Living people
Cornell University alumni
University of Illinois faculty
American mechanical engineers
Bangladeshi mechanical engineers
Year of birth missing (living people)